Nerijus Numa  (born 12 May 1967 in Šilalė as Numavičius, officially has changed his name to Numa in 2020) originally from Lithuania, now lives in the UK. Nerijus Numa is an investor and ultimate beneficial owner (UBO) of private holding company Vilniaus prekyba that controls and by means of its subsidiaries (private liability companies Maxima Group, Euroapotheca, Ermitažas, Akropolis group) operates retail and pharmacy chains, real estate development, shopping center lease and management companies in the Baltic states, Poland, Bulgaria and Sweden. The group is operating in 6 countries and indirectly employs over 46 000 individuals. Nerijus is also a UBO of a private investment group NDX group owing companies operating in food, baby food and pet food production and sales businesses, covering  Poland, Baltic states and Slovakia.

According to a study carried out by the investment bank Prudentia and stock exchange Nasdaq Riga (Riga Stock Exchange), the value of Maxima Group was totaling 1.62 billion and increased by 26% in 2017 (YOY).

Forbes magazine included Nerijus Numavičius in The World's Billionaires 2015 list and his net worth was valued above EUR 1 billion. He was the first billionaire on this list in the Baltic states.

In 2016, Lithuania got first university endowment fund and Nerijus Numavičius became a donor and a board member of Vilnius University Endowment in 2017.

Early life

Nerijus Numavičius was born in Šilalė, a small town in Lithuania, the eldest of six children: three brothers and three sisters. Later the family moved to Šilagalys (near Panevėžys). He graduated from Panevėžio „Žemynos“ progimnazija. In 2001, Numavičius earned a bachelor's degree in medical sciences from the Faculty of Medicine of Vilnius University, where he studied public health.

Business career

The first capital was gained by selling real estate in Lithuania. The received money was successfully invested in various company stocks. In 1992, together with friends and his two brothers, he established Urdzia, a small retail firm in Vilnius. Later, in 1994 Vilniaus prekyba was established by 9 partners, merging 7 various and different size retail stores.

The extensive growth of the retail chain was funded by sale of various stocks that the group acquired during post-Soviet privatization campaigns. One of the transaction involved stock sale of four sugar refineries to Danisco (Danish sugar company). Other companies included Vilniaus paukštynas (poultry farm), Birštono mineraliniai vandenys (mineral water), Vilniaus mėsos kombinatas (meat packing), Vilniaus duona (bakery).

Four sugar refineries stock sale to Danisco was valued at USD 30 million and it created a good opportunities for retail business development. The first new type store of 3000 m2 was opened and Maxima Group brand was born in 1998.

Awards
 Cross of Commander of the Order for Merits to Lithuania (2003)
 The Order of the White Star of Estonia (2004)

References 

Businesspeople from Vilnius
1967 births
Living people
Commander's Crosses of the Order for Merits to Lithuania
Vilnius University alumni
People from Šilalė
Recipients of the Order of the White Star, 3rd Class